The Forecast is an indie rock band from Peoria, Illinois. The Forecast's sound is most recognizable for containing strong two and three part harmonies performed by combinations of their multiple vocalists, as heard in tracks such as "Red as the Moon" and "One Hundred Percent". In 2001, the band was started with Dustin Addis, the only remaining original member. The band's current line up came together in the summer of 2004 when Shannon Burns and Matt Webb left their old band, Casting Lines.  They released a split, a full-length album, and a four-song EP while signed to Thinker Thought Records.  They released their first full-length album, with their current line-up, May 17, 2005 titled Late Night Conversations. The Forecast's Hit, " These Lights" was featured in MVP 06 NCAA Baseball. Their second album, In the Shadow of Two Gunmen was released on May 30, 2006 via Victory Records and was promoted by a national tour with bands Socratic, Mashlin, and Tourmaline.

Early in 2009, the band self-released a five-song E.P titled "Alive For The First Time". The E.P featured two new songs, two acoustic versions of old songs and a cover song.

After spending more than two years unsigned, the group released a self-titled full-length through Eyeball Records on February 16, 2010.

All four members of the Forecast have the band's "ambulance" logo tattooed on them.

In 2020, Dustin Addis was interviewed for Drunken Lullabies, and the interviewer stated that the group has been on hiatus for several years.

Current members
 Shannon Burns - bass/vocals
 Dustin Addis - vocals/guitar
 Tony Peck - drums
 Kevin Ohls - guitar

Former members
 Matt Webb - guitar/vocals
 Jared Grabb - guitar/vocals
 Marsha Satterfield - bass/vocals
 Rhys Miller - drums/vocals
 Derrick Hostetter - drums
 Mitch Leefers - guitar/vocals 
 Craig Comte - drums
 Dan Fiedler - bass/vocals
 Jenni Black - vocals/guitar

Discography

 Proof of Impact (Thinker Thought Records, 2003)
 1090 Club/The Forecast Split (Thinker Thought, 2004)
 Relationships Ruin Friendships EP (Thinker Thought, 2005)
 Late Night Conversations (Victory Records, 2005)
 In the Shadow of Two Gunmen (Victory Records, 2006)
 Alive For The First Time EP (Whiskey Dead Music, 2009)
 The Forecast (Eyeball Records, 2010)
 Everybody Left (Clifton Motel, 2012)

References

External links
The Forecast's Myspace Page
Facebook Page

American emo musical groups
Indie rock musical groups from Illinois
Culture of Peoria, Illinois
Victory Records artists